Tamazgha (Berber: Tamazɣa, Arabic: تامازغا) is a fictitious entity and toponym in Berber languages denoting the lands traditionally inhabited by Berbers coined in the 1970s by the Berber Academy in Paris. The region claims the geographical area between the Mediterranean Sea and the Niger River, a large swathe of territory spanning Morocco, Algeria, Tunisia, Libya, Mauritania, Mali, Niger, Egypt, the Western Sahara, the Canary Islands, Burkina Faso and Senegal.

Although the Berber linguistic root M-Z-Ɣ or Z-Ɣ is ancient, Tamazɣa as a toponym is derived from various Berber languages, coined in the context of Berber nationalism. It appeared for the first time in Algeria and Morocco in the 1970s.

The most densely populated areas of the Tamazgha are the coastal fertile regions of northern Libya, northern and eastern Tunisia, northern Algeria, northern Morocco, and the Atlantic coast of Morocco. "Tamazgha" corresponds roughly to Herodotus' Ancient Libya and to the medieval Barbary Coast.

The term is used by the Berbers because there was not originally a common word that refers to all the geographical territory inhabited by the Mazices, since the Berber people live in several Berber countries, and they are not united politically, with many scattered around the World by the Berber diaspora. So, the name has been created to define an Berber nation, and unify the people of the Tamazgha with their original culture.

The term has been translated into Spanish as Mazigia, abbreviated as MZG and used as an alternative international license plate code for some people.

Notes

Historical regions
Berberism
Divided regions
Geographical neologisms
Maghreb
Proposed countries

ca:Tamazgha
nl:Berberse Wereld